Hanratty is a surname, and may refer to:

 Alice Hanratty (born 1939), Irish artist specialising in printmaking
 James Hanratty (1936–1962), the seventh-to-last person in Britain to be hanged for murder
 Pat Hanratty, Canadian social activist and former president of the New Brunswick New Democratic Party
 Sammi Hanratty (born 1995), American actress
 Terry Hanratty (born 1948), former professional American football quarterback

See also
Related names of Irish, and Dutch Jewish surnames.

 Enright
 Kenraghty

Anglicised Irish-language surnames